The 2008 European Juveniles Baseball Championship was an international baseball competition held in Hluboka nad Vltavou, Czech Republic from July 13 to 18, 2008. It featured teams from Austria, Czech Republic, Lithuania, Poland, Russia and Ukraine.

In the end the team from Czech Republic won the tournament.

Group stage

Pool A

Standings

Game Results

Final round

Final

Final standings

References

External links
Game Results

European Juveniles Baseball Championship
European Juveniles Baseball Championship
International baseball competitions hosted by the Czech Republic
2008 in Czech sport
European Juveniles Baseball Championship
European Juveniles Baseball Championship